Unity, also known as Hodges Park Station, is an unincorporated community in Alexander County, Illinois, United States. Illinois Route 127 passes by Unity south of Tamms. The population as of the 2020 census was 98.

Geography 

Demographics
As of the 2020 census there were 98 people, 25 households, and 13 families residing in the CDP. The racial makeup of the CDP was 17.35% White, 77.55% African American, 0.00% Native American, 0.00% Asian, 0.00% Pacific Islander, 0.00% from other races, and 5.10% from two or more races. Hispanic or Latino of any race were 5.10% of the population.

There were 25 households, none with children under the age of 18 living with them. 52.00% of households were married couples living together. 48.00% of all households were made up of individuals, and 20.00% had someone living alone who was 65 years of age or older. The average household size was 3.85 and the average family size was 2.48.

The CDP's age distribution consisted of none under the age of 18, none from 18 to 24, 25.8% from 25 to 44, 11.3% from 45 to 64, and 62.9% who were 65 years of age or older. The median age was 66.5 years. For every 100 females, there were 148.0 males. For every 100 females age 18 and over, there were 148.0 males.

The median income for a household in the CDP was $59,464; the per capita income was $30,961. No families, and 11.3% of the population were below the poverty line.

Education
Residents are zoned to the Egyptian School District.

References

Unincorporated communities in Alexander County, Illinois
Unincorporated communities in Illinois
Cape Girardeau–Jackson metropolitan area